Paul Miller is a UK-based digital consultant, author and social entrepreneur. He has founded several technology companies and as of 2011, he serves as CEO of the Digital Workplace Group. His books have been nominated for the CMI Management Book of the Year Award.

Biography
Miller was born and brought up in Manchester. After completing LLB from the University of Birmingham, he began his career as an editor and publisher of Wave magazine.

In 1992, Miller founded The Empowerment Group, a communication consultancy company. Miller founded the Digital Workplace Group in 2011, a consultancy company that offers services for intranet and digital workplace measurement and research. He also hosted the internet radio show Digital Workplace Live from 2012 to 2017. He hosts the podcast Digital Workplace Impact.

Miller was named world's Top 50 Social Employee Advocacy Leaders in 2015.

Bibliography
Miller, Paul; Janes, Shimrit (2021). Nature of Work: The new story of work for a living age. TECL Publishing.

References

Living people
Alumni of the University of Birmingham
English radio personalities
Year of birth missing (living people)